Watanabe Shōtei aka  was a Nihonga painter and one of the first to visit Europe, attending the 1878 International Exhibition in Paris and being awarded a medal. Shōtei blended Western realism with the delicate colours and washes of the Kikuchi Yōsai school, introducing a new approach to kachōga or kacho (bird-and-flower painting).

Biography 
Born as Yoshikawa Yoshimata, he was later adopted by the family of his father's literary friend, Watanabe Mitsue. His early studies were at age sixteen under Kikuchi Yōsai (1788–1878) after which he spent a brief time in the studio of the painter and lacquer artist, Shibata Zeshin (1807–1891).

In 1878 he travelled in the United States and Europe, remaining in Paris for three years and becoming the first Nihonga artist to live in Europe with the aim of studying Western painting.

Travel abroad was extremely difficult for Japanese artists in the early Meiji period (1868–1912), and it is unknown how Shōtei managed this. A few years earlier, in 1875, he had produced designs for an export company, which may have provided him with the necessary contacts. His works have enjoyed great popularity in the West, and a large number are to be seen in both European and American collections.

On his return from Europe, Seitei created designs for ceramics and cloisonné, working with the cloisonné artist Namikawa Sosuke (1847–1910), leading to acclaim from abroad. He maintained a prodigious output of paintings and illustrations, producing three outstanding albums:  ('Picture album of Seitei's bird and flower'), 1890–91;  ('Bird and flower album'), 1903; and the last series published in 1916 also entitled .

Watanabe Shotei also edited and contributed to the art magazine  (The World of Art), of which the first number was published by Wada Tokutaro in the year Meiji 23 (1890) and printed by Yoshida Ichimatsu with the blockcuts carried out by Goto Tokujiro. Besides Watanabe's illustration and that of Yoshitoshi Kyosai, there were ten other artists who contributed. Twenty-two of his bird and flower prints were published by Okura Yasugorō in 1916.

During his life he received many awards, in expositions in and out of Japan. He became a major inspiration to the following generation of Nihonga artists, notably Mizuno Toshikata (1866–1908) and Kaburagi Kiyokata (1878–1973).

Gallery

Notes

References
 Conant, Ellen P.; Steven D. Owyoung and J. Thomas Rimer. (1995). Nihonga: Transcending the Past: Japanese-Style Painting, 1868-1968. St. Louis, Missouri: Saint Louis Art Museum.
 Merritt, Helen and Nanako Yamada.  (1995). Guide to Modern Japanese Woodblock Prints, 1900-1975. Honolulu: University of Hawaii Press.	; ;  OCLC 247995392

External links 

1851 births
1918 deaths
19th-century Japanese painters
20th-century Japanese painters